Wampsville is a village located inside the Town of Lenox in Madison County, New York, United States. The population was 543 as of the 2010 census. It is the county seat of  Madison County.

The Village of Wampsville is in the northern part of the county and near the eastern town line of Lenox.

History 
The village was founded by Johann Myndert Wemple (1766–1837) and was formerly called Wempsville.

Wampsville was chosen as the seat of Madison County because neighboring Oneida, to the east, and Canastota to the west both wanted the distinction and could not reach a resolution. The county courthouse faces north so that it does not face either locality.

Geography
Wampsville is located at  (43.081507, −75.708041).

Demographics

As of the census of 2000, there were 561 people, 204 households, and 147 families residing in the village. The population density was 554.3 people per square mile (214.5/km2). There were 211 housing units at an average density of 208.5 per square mile (80.7/km2). The racial makeup of the village was 96.08% White, 0.18% African American, 0.71% Native American, 0.36% Asian, 0.18% Pacific Islander, 0.36% from other races, and 2.14% from two or more races. Hispanic or Latino of any race were 1.60% of the population.

There were 204 households, out of which 38.2% had children under the age of 18 living with them, 60.8% were married couples living together, 8.8% had a female householder with no husband present, and 27.5% were non-families. 20.1% of all households were made up of individuals, and 10.8% had someone living alone who was 65 years of age or older. The average household size was 2.75 and the average family size was 3.22.

In the village, the population was spread out, with 31.6% under the age of 18, 5.9% from 18 to 24, 30.8% from 25 to 44, 19.4% from 45 to 64, and 12.3% who were 65 years of age or older. The median age was 35 years. For every 100 females, there were 103.3 males. For every 100 females age 18 and over, there were 93.0 males.

The median income for a household in the village was $39,063, and the median income for a family was $42,679. Males had a median income of $35,809 versus $25,938 for females. The per capita income for the village was $16,636. About 5.4% of families and 4.3% of the population were below the poverty line, including 3.7% of those under age 18 and none of those age 65 or over.

Notable people
 Milton De Lano, former US Congressman
 Pierce Downer, founder of Downers Grove, Illinois

References

External links
  Village of Wampsville, Madison County, New York

Villages in New York (state)
County seats in New York (state)
Syracuse metropolitan area
Villages in Madison County, New York